Hans Fredrik Gude (March 13, 1825August 17, 1903) was a Norwegian romanticist painter and is considered along with Johan Christian Dahl to be one of Norway's foremost landscape painters. He has been called a mainstay of Norwegian National Romanticism. He is associated with the Düsseldorf school of painting.

Gude's artistic career was not one marked with drastic change and revolution, but was instead a steady progression that slowly reacted to general trends in the artistic world. Gude's early works are of idyllic, sun-drenched Norwegian landscapes which present a romantic, yet still realistic view of his country. Around 1860 Gude began painting seascapes and other coastal subjects. Gude had difficulty with figure drawing initially and so collaborated with Adolph Tidemand in some of his painting, drawing the landscape himself and allowing Tidemand to paint the figures. Later Gude would work specifically on his figures while at Karlsruhe, and so began populating his paintings with them. Gude initially painted primarily with oils in a studio, basing his works on studies he had done earlier in the field. However, as Gude matured as a painter he began to paint en plein air and espoused the merits of doing so to his students. Gude would paint with watercolors later in life as well as gouache in an effort to keep his art constantly fresh and evolving, and although these were never as well received by the public as his oil paintings, his fellow artists greatly admired them.

Gude spent forty-five years as an art professor and so he played an important role in the development of Norwegian art by acting as a mentor to three generations of Norwegian artists.  Young Norwegian artists flocked to wherever Gude was teaching, first at the Academy of Art in Düsseldorf and later at the School of Art in Karlsruhe.  Gude also served as a professor at the Berlin Academy of Art from 1880 to 1901, although he attracted few Norwegians to the Berlin Academy because by this time Berlin had been surpassed in prestige in the eyes of young Norwegian artists by Paris.

Over the course of his lifetime Gude won numerous medals, was inducted as an honorary member into many art academies, and was awarded the Grand Cross of the Order of St. Olav. He was the father of painter Nils Gude and watercolorist and illustrator Agnes Charlotte Guide. His daughter Sigrid married German sculptor Otto Lessing.

Early life

Gude was born in Christiania in 1825 the son of Ove Gude, a judge, and Marie Elisabeth Brandt.

Gude began his artistic career with private lessons from Johannes Flintoe, and by 1838 he was attending Flintoe's evening classes at the Royal School of Drawing in Christiania. In the autumn of 1841 Johan Sebastian Welhaven suggested that the young Gude should be sent to Düsseldorf to further his education in the arts.

Academy of Art in Düsseldorf
At the Academy of Art in Düsseldorf Gude encountered Johann Wilhelm Schirmer – a professor in landscape painting – who advised him to give up his ambitions of being a painter and to return to his regular studies before it was too late. Gude was rejected by the academy, but attracted the attention of Andreas Achenbach who provided him with private lessons.

As a student

Gude was finally accepted into the academy in the autumn of 1842 and joined Schirmer's landscape painting class where he made quick progress. The landscape painting class at the academy was new at the time, having been founded in 1839 as a counterpart to the more long standing figure painting class. At the time figure painting was considered a more prestigious genre than landscape painting as it was thought only through painting the human body could true beauty be expressed.

Gude, along with most of the class of twelve, received a grade of "good" his first semester and was described as "talented". On his report card for the 1843–44 school year he was the only student to be described as "very talented", and the report for his fourth year said that he "paints Norwegian scenery in a truthful and distinctive manner".

While Gude was a student, two different trends in landscaping were developing at the academy: a romantic trend and a classical trend. The romanticists depicted wild, untamed wildernesses with dark forests, soaring peaks, and rushing water to capture the terrifying and overpowering aspects of nature. They used rich, saturated colors with strong contrast of light and shadow. The classicists were more interested in recreating landscapes from the heroic or mythical past and often set them in the midst of religious or historical events. The classicists focused on lines and clarity in their compositions. It was through Achenbach – Gude's first teacher upon arriving in Düsseldorf – that he was exposed to the romanticist tradition, while it was through his classes with and later time teaching for Schirmer that he was exposed to the classicist traditions.

In 1827 Schirmer and Carl Friedrich Lessing founded a Society for Landscape Composition that would meet a few times each year at Schirmer's home where Schirmer would offer advice on the composition of landscape paintings. Fifteen years later Gude began attending the meetings of the society with other students from his class, but as he progressed to greater levels of realism Gude began to make it clear that he did not agree with the ideas of composition Schirmer put forward during the meetings, saying specifically:

In Düsseldorf Gude met Carl Friedrich Lessing who, while initially aloof, became Gude's friend and colleague. Their relationship was such a close one that Gude's eldest daughter eventually married one of Lessing's sons. The two artists differed in style though, with Lessing painting dramatic, historical works while Gude never once introduced historical events into his own paintings.

Gude served as a student teacher at the academy until 1844, before leaving to live in Christiania. On July 25, 1850, Gude married Betsy Charlotte Juliane Anker (1830–1912), the daughter of General Erik Anker, in Christiania (today called Oslo).

Professorship

In 1854 Gude was appointed the professor of landscape painting at the academy replacing his former teacher Schirmer. Gude was twenty-nine when appointed, making him the youngest professor at the academy. His appointment was partially political, in a conflict between Rhineland and Prussian interests Gude was seen as a neutral candidate because of his Norwegian roots. Gude was recommended for the position by the current Director of the academy Wilhelm von Schadow, but only after Andreas Achenbach, Oswald Achenbach, and Lessing had refused the post due to lack of suitable pay. In regards to his position and compensation, Gude wrote:

Throughout his tenure, Gude had private pupils in addition to his normal classes. As a professor Gude taught six hours of class, held two hours of office hours, took turns with other professors supervising the nude drawing class and attended staff meetings. In 1857 Gude handed in his resignation, officially citing family considerations and failing health as his reasons for resigning, although in his memoirs he blamed opposition and backbiting from two of his pupils. The landscape painting professorship was the bottom of the pay scale at the academy, and Gude was one of the few professors to be refused a raise when others received them in 1855. Others have suggested that Gude wished to leave the academy for fear for becoming stuck in a rut artistically. Gude received better treatment from the academy after he turned in his resignation, and it would take him a full five years to finally leave Düsseldorf. Although professors at the academy complained that their teaching prevented them from undertaking more lucrative endeavors, Gude was able to sell enough works to afford a modest house in Düsseldorf which stood in what is now Hofgarten.

Norwegian or German art
By the mid-19th century the academy in Düsseldorf had become a center for training Norwegian artists, but within Norway there arose a debate as to whether the art was truly Norwegian as it did not originate in Norway, and was in fact produced by artists who had been trained in Germany. The debate was sparked by proposals to build an art school in Norway, and it was therefore essential for supporters of a Norwegian academy to argue that Norwegian values could not be instilled in the artists if they had to go abroad.

In a letter to Jørgen Moe Gude writes that he see possibility for his own development in Düsseldorf, and that even if it would cause him to be known as a German artist instead of a Norwegian, he would not be ashamed of the fact. In defense of Norwegian artists at the academy, Gude writes that they were not simply imitating German artists:

Gude was convinced that for Norwegian artists at the academy it was impossible to escape their heritage and that Norway influenced their art whether they wanted it to or not. On this subject he wrote:

Von Schadow however argued the Gude's art was in fact German in an attempt to defend his nomination of Gude to succeed Schirmer. He wrote of Gude that "His education is totally German, his style unwontedly elevated."

Wales

Many of Gude's peers moved on from the academy in Düsseldorf to other art institutes, but Gude decided to seek more direct contact with nature. Gude had gained a foothold in the British art market in the 1850s after his works were accepted into the galleries of Francis Egerton, 1st Earl of Ellesmere and the Marquess of Lansdowne, and so when an English art dealer and former student of Gude – Mr. Stiff – suggested Gude might find success in England, he was quick to respond. In the autumn of 1862 Gude set off for the Lledr Valley near Conwy. Wales, a place renowned for its picturesque scenery, was already home to a colony of British plein-air artists. While small groups of artists living in the countryside in order to inspire each other, be closer to their subject and escape the city were common, Gude was one of the first Norwegian artists to live in such a manner. Gude rented a house overlooking River Lledr where he painted one of the ancient Roman bridges which was popular with artists of the time.

Gude reports that the British and Welsh landscape painters were disdainful of artists from the continent, and that they used a very different style of painting from the continental artists.  Whereas Gude and fellow continental artists would go out in nature and make sketches to act as studies for studio works, the British and Welsh painters set up their easels in the field and worked on their paintings with their subjects in front of them. Gude attempted to improve his reputation among the local painters with exhibitions at the Royal Academy's spring shows in London in 1863 and 1864, but both were flops that Gude described as "useful but bitter medicine". Despite these setbacks – furthered by the strain the trip had put on Gude's finances due to lack of paintings being sold – Gude felt the trip was of great benefit to himself as an artist, writing to his brother-in-law Theodor Kjerulf:

While in Wales Gude was visited by Adolph Tidemand together with Frederik Collett, and the three traveled to Caernarvon and Holyhead from which Gude observed his first real Atlantic storm.

Baden School of Art

In December 1863 Gude was offered and accepted a professorship at the Baden School of Art in Karlsruhe where he would once again succeed Schirmer, and so he left Wales. Gude was hesitant to take the position as he felt that it was working for the enemy but was unable to support himself in Norway due to the lack of an art school. He wrote about his thoughts on the position to Kjerulf, stating:

It is suspected that Gude was offered the professorship due to a recommendation from Lessing. When Gude accepted the position at Karlsruhe the flow of Norwegian painters to the Düsseldorf Academy redirected to Karlsruhe, which would produce many of the Norwegian painters of the 1860s and 1870s, among them Frederik Collett, Johan Martin Nielssen, Kitty L. Kielland, Nicolai Ulfsten, Eilif Peterssen, Marcus Grønvold, Otto Sinding, Christian Krohg and Frits Thaulow.

In Karlsruhe Gude continued to faithfully reproduce the landscapes he saw, a style that he passed on to his students by taking them to Chiemsee to paint the lake en plein air. While on these trips Gude and his pupils often encountered Eduard Schleich the Elder with his own students from Munich who were, as Gude described, only out to capture the mood of the scene and were skeptical of the advantages of painting in the sunshine. Gude also took special interest in how light reflected in water while in Karlsruhe, as well as expanding his study of the human figure. Although Gude rarely portrayed humans for their own sake, he began populating his paintings with convincing, if sometimes anatomically incorrect, individuals.

Gude's painted Fra Chiemsee while at Karlsruhe. The painting which was shown in Vienna was so enthusiastically received that it was purchased by the Kunsthistorisches Hofmuseum for display, won Gude a number of medals, and earned him membership in the Academy of Fine Arts Vienna.

The school in Karlsruhe was founded by the Grand Duke of Baden whom Gude had good relations with. Because of this fact Gude received better pay than at the Düsseldorf Academy, had spacious and rent-free accommodations and was given generous periods of leave which allowed him to travel in the summer to perform studies for future paintings. Gude served as the director of Karlsruhe from 1866 to 1868 and again from 1869 to 1870, where he introduced several of his own educational principles designed to develop pupil's individual talent. But Gude's reign as director at Karlsruhe was not without resistance to his methods, and it is this opposition that he cites as his reason for visiting the Berlin Academy of Art that as early as 1874 in search of better conditions. Because of Gude's visits to Berlin, his relation with the Grand Duke became strained as the Grand Duke felt that the concessions he had made to Gude were so great that Gude should be grateful and not look for a professorships elsewhere. Gude remained at Karlsruhe for six more years after his first visits to the Berlin Academy of Art, but in 1880 he decided to retire from the Karlsruhe school to take up a position in Berlin.

Berlin Academy of Art
In 1880 Gude accepted a position to lead the master studio in landscape painting at the Academy of Art in Berlin, a position which gave him a spot on the academy's Senate. The Senate was responsible for upholding "all the artistic interests of the state" and membership was a mark of the highest official recognition of Gude's work.

In 1895 the Christiania Art Society held a comprehensive retrospective of Gude's works including his paintings, oil studies, watercolors, sketches and etchings. When asked what should be shown at the exhibition Gude replied that "[...]perhaps room could be found for studies and drawings; I rather think that these will meet with interest. They are also (unfortunately) of greater artistic value." By the time of the exhibition Gude had abandoned his previous style of painting large-scale compositions based on studies, and was working in mediums other than oil. In Berlin Gude began working more heavily in gouache and watercolor in an effort to preserve the 'freshness' of his art. Although Gude did not heavily exhibit his watercolors they still gained admiration from follow painters, including Harriet Backer who said:

Gude would spend a few weeks each summer near the Baltic coast where he drew material for numerous paintings of Ahlbeck and Rügen. Although Gude filled these paintings with more figures than his earlier works, his focus was still on accurately capturing the scene and especially the landscape.

As the century drew to a close the established art academies faced 'secession' movements from groups of artists looking to branch of into different style.  Gude rallied around his friend Anton von Werner in defending the academies, going so far as to mock "the so-called Symbolism" movement. As Gude approached the end of his life he felt more and more unable to keep up with the changes in the art world. After a disappointing exhibition in Kristiania in 1902 Gude wrote to Johan Martin Nielssen:

In 1880 Gude had between five and eight students, but this number had shrunk to two or three by 1890. In part this reduction of pupils was due to a lack of interest in the Berlin academy, as explained to Gude by Prince Eugén, Duke of Närke who wrote that he, as well as numerous other young artists, had more of a taste for French art than German.

Gude retired from the Berlin Academy in 1901. He died two years later in Berlin in 1903.

Works

Awards and honors

 1852 – Gold medal at Berlin Exhibition
 1855 – Medal, 2nd class, Paris Exhibition
 1860 – Gold medal at Berlin Exhibition
 1861 – Medal, 2nd class, Paris Exhibition
 1867 – Medal, 2nd class, Paris Exhibition
 1873 – Gold medal at Vienna Exhibition for Nødhavn Ved Norskekysten
 1876 – Medal for A Fresh Breeze, Norwegian Coast and Calm, Christianiaford in Philadelphia at United States Centennial Commission International Exhibition
 1880 – Member of Berlin Academy of Art's Senate
 1894 – Grand Cross of the Order of St. Olav

Gude was also a member of the Order of the Zähringer Lion, Order of the Red Eagle, and the Order of Franz Joseph.

Academy memberships
Gude earned membership in the following art academies:
 Amsterdam
 Berlin
 Copenhagen
 Rotterdam
 Stockholm
 Vienna

Notes

References

External links
 The family tree of Hans Gude on Geni.com
 Biography on Norsk biografisk leksikon

1825 births
1903 deaths
Norwegian landscape painters
Norwegian romantic painters
Norwegian realist painters
Artists from Oslo
19th-century Norwegian people
Norwegian expatriates in Germany
Academic staff of the Prussian Academy of Arts
19th-century Norwegian painters
Norwegian male painters
19th-century Norwegian male artists
Düsseldorf school of painting